Ptyomaxia trigonogramma is a moth of the family Pyralidae first described by Alfred Jefferis Turner in 1947.  It is known from Australia and New Zealand.

References

Phycitinae
Moths of New Zealand
Taxa named by Alfred Jefferis Turner
Moths of Australia
Moths described in 1947